was a town located in Minamisaitama District, Saitama Prefecture, Japan.

As of 2003, the town had an estimated population of 21,837 and a density of 797.84 persons per km2. The total area was 27.67 km2. Shobu is well known among other parts of Saitama for housing the large shopping complex Mallage, which is a source of shopping and enjoyment for many of Shobus' citizens, and has put Shobu on the map. There is a large road, Ken-O expressway which is being built through Shobu at this present time. The famous conservationist, Honda Seiroku, who designed many of Japan's city and National parks was born in Shobu.

On March 23, 2010, Shōbu, along with the towns of Kurihashi and Washimiya (both from Kitakatsushika District), was merged into the expanded city of Kuki.

At Shōbu, there was Shobu-Kuki transmitter, one of the largest stations for AM and shortwave broadcasting in Japan.

References

Dissolved municipalities of Saitama Prefecture
Populated places disestablished in 2010
2010 disestablishments in Japan